Beaconsfield is a constituency in Buckinghamshire represented in the House of Commons of the UK Parliament since 2019 by Joy Morrissey of the Conservative Party. She succeeded Independent and former Conservative Dominic Grieve, whom she defeated following his suspension from the party. The constituency was established for the February 1974 general election.

History

The constituency was created in 1974, mostly from the former seat of South Buckinghamshire, since which date the area has formed the southernmost part of Buckinghamshire — before 1974 the notable settlements of Slough and Eton, as well as less well-known Langley, Wraysbury, Sunnymeads and Datchet were in the county.

This leads to the shape of the constituency, further accentuated in irregularity by the Thames meander containing Cookham, Berkshire to the west and southwest.

1982 by-election candidates
In the 1982 Beaconsfield by-election caused by the death of Sir Ronald Bell, the third-placed candidate was Tony Blair for the Labour Party. Conservative Tim Smith was the first and only person ever to have beaten Blair in an election and won; Liberal Paul Tyler was in second place. Tyler later became an MP for North Cornwall, meaning that, most unusually, the three main-party candidates subsequently served in the House of Commons at the same time.

2010 election
Incumbent Dominic Grieve's win in 2010, with 61.1% of the vote, was the second highest share of the vote in the general election for a Conservative candidate after William Hague in Richmond (Yorks).

2016 EU referendum
Beaconsfield is estimated to have voted 51% remain in the 2016 referendum on the UK's membership of the EU. Although estimates of the constituency results have not been confirmed, the official UK Electoral Commission EU referendum results detail the area of South Buckinghamshire, which contains the Beaconsfield constituency, as voting to leave the EU with a percentage of 50.7%.

Boundaries and boundary changes 

1974–1983: The Urban District of Beaconsfield, the Rural District of Eton and the parishes of Hedsor and Wooburn in the Rural District of Wycombe.

The constituency was formed largely from southern parts of the abolished County Constituency of South Buckinghamshire (Beaconsfield and the Rural District of Eton). The parishes of Hedsor and Wooburn were transferred from the County Constituency of Wycombe.

1983–1997: The District of South Bucks and the District of Wycombe wards of Bourne End-cum-Hedsor, Flackwell Heath, Loudwater, The Wooburns, Tylers Green.

Gained areas to the east of High Wycombe (former parish of Chepping Wycombe) from Wycombe. The parts of the former Rural District of Eton, including Datchet, which had been transferred from Buckinghamshire to Berkshire by the Local Government Act 1972 were included in the new County Constituency of East Berkshire.

1997–2010: The District of South Bucks and the District of Wycombe wards of Bourne End-cum-Hedsor, Flackwell Heath, Little Marlow, Loudwater, The Wooburns, Tylers Green.

Minor change (transfer of Little Marlow from Wycombe).

2010–present: The District of South Bucks and the District of Wycombe wards of Bourne End-cum-Hedsor, Flackwell Heath and Little Marlow, Marlow North and West, Marlow South East, The Wooburns.

Marlow transferred from Wycombe.

The seat consists of Beaconsfield, most of Burnham (including Burnham Beeches forest), Denham, Dorney, Farnham Common, Farnham Royal, Fulmer, Gerrards Cross, Hedgerley, Iver, Stoke Poges, Taplow and Wexham (excluding Wexham Court); Hedsor, Little Marlow, Marlow, Wooburn and Bourne End and the Flackwell Heath settlement of Chepping Wycombe.

Members of Parliament

Elections

Elections in the 2020s

Elections in the 2010s

Elections in the 2000s

Elections in the 1990s

Elections in the 1980s

:

Elections in the 1970s

See also
1982 Beaconsfield by-election
List of parliamentary constituencies in Buckinghamshire

Notes

References

Sources
Richard Kimber's Political Science Resources: UK General Elections since 1832 

Parliamentary constituencies in Buckinghamshire
Constituencies of the Parliament of the United Kingdom established in 1974
South Bucks District
Beaconsfield